Anne of Denmark (Danish and German: Anna; Haderslev, 22 November 1532 – Dresden, 1 October 1585) was a Danish princess from the House of Oldenburg. Through her marriage with Augustus of Saxony she became Electress of Saxony. She was renowned for her knowledge of plants and her skill in the preparation of herbal remedies, and contributed to the development of farming and horticulture in Saxony. She was a major influence in the introduction of orthodox Lutheranism and played a role in the decision to persecute Calvinists.

Childhood
Anna of Denmark was a daughter of King Christian III of Denmark and Norway and his wife Dorothea of Saxe-Lauenburg. Her mother taught her the basic principles of gathering medicinal plants and preparing herbal remedies. After the introduction of Protestantism in Denmark-Norway in 1537, she was raised as a strict orthodox Lutheran.

In March 1548 she became betrothed to Augustus of Saxony, the younger brother and possible heir of Elector Maurice of Saxony. This marriage supported the Danish ambition to have closer ties to Germany. The Elector on his part wanted to achieve better relations with the Lutheran factions. The wedding took place in Torgau in October 1548. It was the first major festivity in the reign of Elector Maurice and the first opportunity for the Albertinian line of the House of Wettin to present themselves as Electors of Saxony, a title they had obtained in 1547.

Electress 
Anna and Augustus initially lived in Weißenfels. When Augustus became Elector in 1553 following the death of his brother Maurice, they lived mainly in Dresden. They had fifteen children, four of whom reached adulthood. Their marriage was considered to be harmonious.

Anna of Denmark was a great writer of letters and kept a good archive of her correspondence. Her letters provide detailed insight into her daily life and her involvement in the political and religious affairs of her time. In Saxony, and throughout Europe, she was considered to be a person of considerable influence. She was a very active advocate of Lutheranism and played a role in the suppression of crypto-Calvinism in Saxony between 1574 and 1577. It is unclear to what extent she was involved in the harsh persecution of Calvinists which included torture and long periodes of incarceration. She had good relations with other royal and princely houses and was frequently asked to act as an intermediary, in conflicts as well as in marriage negotiations.

Agriculture and pharmacy
During her lifetime, Anna of Denmark was known for her skill in managing gardens and farmland. In 1578, her husband entrusted her with the management of all his estates. She contributed to the development of agriculture in Saxony by introducing new crops and new species of livestock, and promoted the introduction of horticulture as practiced in the Low Countries and Denmark. This had a positive effect on the economy of Saxony, which became one of the most prosperous parts of Germany. She was an acknowledged expert in herbal lore and personally prepared herbal remedies; she is now considered to have been the first female pharmacist in Germany. She was however not professionally active, in contrast to her contemporaries Helena Magenbuch and Maria Andreae.  In castle Annaburg, which was named after her, she had her own large laboratory and library.

Death

Anna of Denmark died on October 1, 1585 after a long period of ill health. She remains one of the best known Electresses of Saxony, partly because of biographies written about her in the 19th century which emphasise her traditional role as 'mother of the nation.'

Children
John Henry (b. Weissenfels, 5 May 1550 – d. Weissenfels, 12 November 1550).
Eleonore (b. Wolkenstein, 2 May 1551 – d. Wolkenstein, 24 April 1553).
Elisabeth (b. Wolkenstein, 18 October 1552 – d. imprisoned in Heidelberg, 2 April 1590), married on 4 June 1570 to Count Palatine Johann Casimir of Simmern; they were separated in 1589.
Alexander (b. Dresden, 21 February 1554 – d. Dresden, 8 October 1565), Hereditary Elector of Saxony.
Magnus (b. Dresden, 24 September 1555 – d. Dresden, 6 November 1558).
Joachim (b. Dresden, 3 May 1557 – d. Dresden, 21 November 1557).
Hector (b. Dresden, 7 October 1558 – d. Dresden, 4 April 1560).
Christian I (b. Dresden, 29 October 1560 – d. Dresden, 25 September 1591), successor of his father in the Electorship.
Marie (b. Torgau, 8 March 1562 – d. Torgau, 6 January 1566).
Dorothea (b. Dresden, 4 October 1563 – d. Wolfenbüttel, 13 February 1587), married on 26 September 1585 to Duke Heinrich Julius of Brunswick-Wolfenbüttel.
Amalie (b. Dresden, 28 January 1565 – d. Dresden, 2 July 1565).
Anna (b. Dresden, 16 November 1567 – d. imprisoned in Veste Coburg, 27 January 1613), married on 16 January 1586 to Duke John Casimir, Duke of Saxe-Coburg-Eisenach; they divorced in 1593.
Augustus (b. Dresden, 23 October 1569 – d. Dresden, 12 February 1570).
Adolf (b. Stolpen, 8 August 1571 – d. Dresden, 12 March 1572).
Frederick (b. Annaberg, 18 June 1575 – d. Annaberg, 24 January 1577).

Ancestry

Literature
 .
 .
 .
 .
 .
 .
 .
 .
 .
 .
 .
 .
 .

References

External links

|-
 

 

1532 births
1585 deaths
Danish princesses
Norwegian princesses
Duchesses of Saxony
Electresses of Saxony
Albertine branch
Children of Christian III of Denmark
Burials at Freiberg Cathedral
Daughters of kings